Sheykh Aib (also Romanized as Sheykh ‘Aīb) is a village in Jowzar Rural District, in the Central District of Mamasani County, Fars Province, Iran. At the 2006 census, its population was 27, in 7 families.

References 

Populated places in Mamasani County